The Universidad Americana (Spanish for American University) is a private university located in Paraguay.

Founded in 1994, the university has two teaching facilities in Asunción, one in Ciudad del Este and one in Encarnación. It has 4,000 students, and more than 200 professors.

Colleges
The university has four colleges:
 College of Law and Social Sciences
 College of Economic Sciences and Business
 College of Communication, Art and Technology
 College of Health Sciences

Notable alumni
The following are alumni of the university:
 Alba Riquelme
 Ansoni Lemans
 Iván Zavala
 Leryn Franco
 Roque Santa Cruz
 Marco Trovato
 Lucia Sapena
 Sol Cartes
 Nadia Ferreira
 Annick Vaesken
 Jazmin Mernes
 Magalí Caballero
 Soledad Cardozo
 Marcia Franco
 Pablo Tomé
 Iván Arturo Torres
 Yeruti Garcia
 Marcelo Medina 
 Rossana Mazó
 Paola Gisselle Bugs Siegel
 Devanny Cáceres
 Lia Ashmore

References

External links
 Official website 

1994 establishments in Paraguay
Educational institutions established in 1994
Buildings and structures in Asunción
Education in Asunción
Universidad Americana (Paraguay)
Ciudad del Este